is a former Japanese singer and actress. She first gained recognition when she joined Hello! Project Kids and later became one of the lead vocalists of the girl group Berryz Kobo from 2004 to 2015.

Career

2002–2004: Hello! Project Kids, 4Kids

Sugaya was born in Kanagawa, Japan. In 2002, she auditioned for Hello! Project Kids with the song "Minimoni Hinamatsuri" by Minimoni. Her audition tape was aired on Morning Musume's variety show Hello! Morning. She was placed in the group with 14 other girls. She made her first appearance as an angel in the 2002 film Mini Moni ja Movie: Okashi na Daibōken!; she also was one of the featured artists in the movie's ending song as a member of 4Kids.

In 2003, Sugaya starred in the movie Hotaru no Hoshi (蛍の星), as Hikari, a fragile elementary school student who, with the help of her caring teacher, has a chance to be momentarily reunited with her deceased mother and overcome her emotional problems. She also starred in the drama, Shonan Kawarayane Monogatari. That year also marked her first appearance on Kōhaku Uta Gassen, as one of Aya Matsuura's backup dancers, during the 54th edition of the renowned NHK New Year program.

2004–2015: Berryz Kobo

In early 2004, Sugaya became part of the newly formed group Berryz Kobo. Since joining the group, she has also participated in the band's weekly radio show Berryz Kobo Kiritsu! Rei! Chakuseki!. She has also, like other Hello! Project members, appeared in the Musume Dokyu! segments, namely episodes 39, 40, 54, 55, and 56. Additionally, Sugaya has done a commercial for the Nihon Shokuniku Shōhi Sōgō Center in October 2003.

Later, in 2004, she participated in singing "All for One & One for All!", a collaboration single released by all Hello! Project artists under the name "H.P. All Stars."

In August 2006, Sugaya was interviewed by MC Maki Goto in the 12th installment of the online only show Hello! Pro Hour. She later re-appeared alongside Momoko Tsugunaga on the 20th and final episode.

On 12 October 2006, Sugaya became the first member of Berryz Kobo, and the youngest of all the Hello! Project members, to release a solo photobook. Even prior to its release, the photobook was met with mixed feelings both by Japanese and overseas fans. Sugaya herself admitted, in an interview with Sanspo.com, to initially having doubts regarding the photoshoot, but claims to have had a pleasant experience and hopes her fans enjoy the various facets of her personality.

On 31 December 2006, Sugaya once again took the stage at the 57th NHK Kōhaku Uta Gassen as a backup dancer in Morning Musume's performance of Aruiteru, along with the remaining members of Berryz Kobo, Country Musume and Cute. In mid-2009, Sugaya became a member of new unit Guardians 4.

On 2 August 2014, it was announced that Berryz Kobo would be going on an indefinite hiatus from 3 March 2015. Further, Sugaya announced she would be taking a break from show business following the cessation of group activities.

Personal life

In October 2017, Sugaya announced her marriage to a man whose identity is undisclosed, and they met through a mutual friend. In addition to this, she was five months pregnant at that time. She gave birth to a girl at 1 March 2018. She had her second child in 2020.

Discography

Singles

DVDs 
  (21 January 2003)
  (18 June 2003)
  (30 June 2004)
  (22 December 2004)
  (7 December 2005)
  (14 December 2005)
  (22 February 2006)
  (24 January 2007)

Solo DVDs

Limited edition DVDs 
  (13 December 2005, 15 March 2006)
  (14 February 2006)
 "Risako Sugaya DVD on Hello! Project Sports Festival 2006" (1 July 2006)
  (16 December 2006)
  (1 April 2007)
  (26 January 2008)
  (16 March 2008)
  (1 April 2008)

Radio 
   (30 March 2005 – 31 March 2009)
  (3 July 2009 – 30 March 2012) (Co-hosts: Miyabi Natsuyaki and Yurina Kumai)

Photobooks 
  (12 October 2006, Wani Books) 
  (20 July 2007, Wani Books) 
  (6 February 2008, Kadokawa Group Publishing) 
  (27 November 2009, Wani Books)

References

External links 
 Berryz Kobo: Official Hello! Project profile 
 

1994 births
Berryz Kobo members
Hello! Project Kids members
V-u-den members
Japanese idols
Japanese child actresses
Japanese child singers
Japanese voice actresses
Japanese women pop singers
Living people
Musicians from Kanagawa Prefecture
21st-century Japanese singers
21st-century Japanese women singers